Börsenverein des Deutschen Buchhandels (English: German Publishers and Booksellers Association) is a trade association of the German publishing industry, based in Frankfurt. It was founded in Frankfurt in 1948, and merged in 1991 with a similar Leipzig organisation. It organises the annual Frankfurt Book Fair, where the peace prize Friedenspreis des Deutschen Buchhandels has been awarded from 1950.

History 

When Leipzig was in the Soviet zone after World War II, the western part needed a representation. In 1948, a Arbeitsgemeinschaft Deutscher Verleger- und Buchhändler-Verbände was founded in the American and British zones, which was renamed Börsenverein Deutscher Verleger- und Buchhändlerverbände. The present name, Börsenverein des Deutschen Buchhandels, was established in 1955. In 1972, personal membership was replaced by institutional membership. From 1974 to 2000, Hans-Karl von Kupsch was managing director. After German reunification, he led the unification with the similar organisation in Leipzig.

The office was in Frankfurt, Großer Hirschgraben 17–21, next to the Goethe House.

Program 

The Börsenverein organises the annual Frankfurter Buchmesse (Frankfurt Book Fair). Beginning in 1950, the Friedenspreis des Deutschen Buchhandels has been issued at the Paulskirche as part of the fair. It supports (as ideeller Träger) the Leipziger Buchmesse, where it awards the annual Leipzig Book Award for European Understanding.

Additionally, since 2002, the association has awarded non-monetary literature prizes. This began with the Deutscher Bücherpreis at the 2002 Leipzig Book Fair with several categories including international books, and since 2004 has been replaced by the German Book Prize, which is only awarded to one German-language book each year.

Memberships 
The association is member of the International Publishers Association, the Internationale Buchhändler-Vereinigung, the Federation of European Publishers and the European Booksellers Federation.

See also

References

Further reading 
 Der Börsenverein des Deutschen Buchhandels 1825 bis 2000 – Ein geschichtlicher Aufriss, eds. ,  and Hermann Staub with Monika Estermann, Buchhändler-Vereinigung, Frankfurt am Main 2000, .
 Geschichte des deutschen Buchhandels im 19. und 20. Jahrhundert. eds.
 Klaus-W. Bramann, C. Daniel Hoffmann, Peter Cremer: Wirtschaftsunternehmen Sortiment.  4th edition, Bramann, Frankfurt, 2014, .

External links 

 
 
 

Bookselling trade associations
Organizations established in 1948
Clubs and societies in Germany
1948 establishments in Germany